Kelton House may refer to:

Kelton House (Hartville, Missouri), listed on the NRHP in Wright County, Missouri
 Kelton House Museum and Garden, a house museum in Columbus, Ohio